Hicaco is a corregimiento in Veraguas Province in the Republic of Panama.

References 

Populated places in Veraguas Province